Byron High School may refer to:

Byron High School (Byron, Illinois), Byron, Illinois
Byron High School (Byron, Michigan), Byron, Michigan (part of the Byron Area Schools District)
Byron High School (Byron, Minnesota), Byron, Minnesota
Byron Center High School, Byron Center, Michigan
Port Byron High School, Port Byron, New York
Byron-Beorgen High School, Bergen, New York
Byron Bay High School, Byron Bay, Australia